Ivan Minchev (Bulgarian: Иван Минчев; born 28 May 1991) is a Bulgarian professional footballer who plays as a midfielder for Slavia Sofia.

Career

Early career
Minchev began his career in his local Rozova Dolina at age of 7 and moved to Litex Lovech Academy at age of 15. In 2009 he moved to Lokomotiv Mezdra Academy, before moving to Lyubimets 2007 a year later.

CSKA Sofia
On 14 June 2016 Minchev signed with the returning on the top level team of CSKA Sofia He made his debut for the CSKA II team on 7 August 2016 in a match against Sozopol, won by CSKA II with 2:0 result. A week later he completed his debut for the first team in a league match against Neftochimic Burgas.

Slavia Sofia
Just 3 months after he joined CSKA and a single appearance for the first team, Minchev moved to Slavia Sofia. He made his debut for the team in a league match on 10 September 2017 against Lokomotiv Plovdiv won by Slavia with 5:2 result. The league match against Vereya played on 1 October was the lucky match for Minchev when he scored his first goal for the club. On 15 April 2017 Minchev was named as Man of the Match in the league match against  his ex club Montana.

On 28 November 2017 Minchev was awarded as Man of the Match in the league match against Cherno More where he scored the first goal for the 2:0 win. Minchev ended his first half of the 2017-18 season with 5 goals and 5 assists in 19 league matches, attracting interest from Russian and Kazakhstan clubs.

Beroe
On 9 June 2018, Minchev signed with Beroe Stara Zagora.

International career
On 2 November 2017 Minchev received his first call-up for Bulgaria for the friendly game against Saudi Arabia. 11 days later he made his debut for the national side in a match, coming on as a substitute in added time of the second half.

Career statistics

Club

Honours
Slavia Sofia
 Bulgarian Cup (1): 2017–18

References

External links

1991 births
Living people
People from Kazanlak
Bulgarian footballers
Bulgaria international footballers
First Professional Football League (Bulgaria) players
Second Professional Football League (Bulgaria) players
PFC Lokomotiv Mezdra players
FC Lyubimets players
PFC Spartak Varna players
FC Montana players
PFC CSKA Sofia players
PFC Slavia Sofia players
PFC Beroe Stara Zagora players
Association football midfielders